The Finnish Folk High School in Gothenburg is a secondary school in Gothenburg, Sweden. It is one of 150 such schools in the Swedish educational system. In 2014, the school has a staff of 45 persons, including a headmaster, two directors of studies, 30 teachers and teacher assistants and service staff.

The school is located in a disadvantaged suburb with many immigrants, outside the center of Gothenburg. At first the school serviced only Finnish speaking immigrants, but in 1996 it was designated a Multicultural Folk High School, taking in immigrants who speak Somali, Arabic and Kurdish. The staff and students speak more than 24 different mother tongues.

Curriculum
The core study subjects are Swedish, English, mathematics, social studies and computer training. There are elective courses in the curriculum of the folk high school courses. These courses provide proficiency on elementary and upper secondary school levels and provide basic qualifications for higher studies.

Students
In 2014, the Finnish Folk High School has 140 full-time students in six general folk high school courses and 120 full-time students of SF1 ‘Swedish for Immigrants". The school has since 2002 a vocational training program to train 40 students as social care workers with multicultural profile. It has also short courses for Finnish seniors in music, oil painting, ceramics and basic computer training.

Special programs
The school has developed local projects for immigrants, to help them integrate into Swedish society, and enter the Swedish labor market .

In 2010 a Montessori Preschool was added, where adult students can leave their children during study hours.

External links
 

Education in Gothenburg
Folk high schools in Sweden
Finland–Sweden relations